The following page lists power stations in Kenya.

Geothermal

Hydroelectric

Fossil fuels: oil, coal, and gas

Wind

Solar

See also 

Energy in Kenya
 List of largest power stations in the world
 List of power stations in Africa

References

External links
 Kenya Electricity Hydro-Power Generation to Fall to 45% in 2014
 Kenya Ranked Eighth Largest Global Geothermal Producer 
  State Plans Two More Hydro-Electric Power Dams On Tana River 

Kenya
 
Power stations